The 1932 Utah Utes football team was an American football team that represented the University of Utah as a member of the Rocky Mountain Conference (RMC) during the 1932 college football season. In their eighth season under head coach Ike Armstrong, the Utes compiled an overall record of 6–1–1 with a mark of 6–0 against conference opponents, winning the RMC title for fifth consecutive season and completing their fourth consecutive year of perfect conference play. Utah outscored all opponents by a total of 162 to 47.

Schedule

References

Utah
Utah Utes football seasons
Rocky Mountain Athletic Conference football champion seasons
Utah Utes football